Heavenly Body is a 2011 Italian drama film directed by Alice Rohrwacher.

Plot
The film relates a young girl's experience of coming to age and receiving Confirmation. Her parish is run by a corrupt priest, Don Mario, and his helpers. The film covers her relationship not only with herself but with the alienating world which surrounds her, including the Catholic Church.

Cast
 Salvatore Cantalupo as Don Mario
 Anita Caprioli as Rita
 Renato Carpentieri as Don Lorenzo
 Paola Lavini as Fortunata
 Pasqualina Scuncia as Santa
 Yle Vianello as Marta

References

External links

2011 drama films
2011 films
2010s coming-of-age drama films
2010s Italian-language films
Films directed by Alice Rohrwacher
Films set in Calabria
Italian coming-of-age drama films
2010s Italian films